William J. Collver  (March 21, 1867 – March 24, 1888) was a 19th-century American Major League Baseball right fielder. He was born in Clyde, Ohio. He played in one game, on July 4, 1885 for the Boston Beaneaters. He was hitless in four at-bats in the game, with one strikeout. He died in 1888, aged 21.

External links

1867 births
1888 deaths
19th-century baseball players
Baseball players from Ohio
Boston Beaneaters players
Major League Baseball outfielders
People from Clyde, Ohio